Una famiglia impossibile (i.e. "An Impossible Family") is a 1940 Italian "white-telephones" comedy film directed by Carlo Ludovico Bragaglia and starring Armando Falconi, Pina Renzi and María Mercader.

Plot  
A wealthy young woman falls in love with a radio singer without ever having seen him. He forces his strange family (a forgetful father, a mother with ideas of greatness, three sisters with a passion for singing and another who takes care of abandoned children) to go to the EIAR headquarters to be able to meet him.

Cast 
Armando Falconi as Giovanni Bartolla
Pina Renzi as Cesira Bartolla 
María Mercader as Edvige Bartolla 
 Clely Fiamma as  Anna Bartolla
Isa Bellini as  Marina Bartolla
Thea Prandi as  Nerina Bartolla
 Wilma Mangini as  Malvina Bartolla
Sergio Tofano as  The Butler
Alberto Rabagliati as The Radio Singer
Arturo Bragaglia as  The Poor Relative
Stefano Sibaldi as  The Director
Paolo Stoppa 
Pippo Barzizza 
Nunzio Filogamo

References

External links

1940 comedy films
1940 films
Italian comedy films
Films directed by Carlo Ludovico Bragaglia
Films with screenplays by Cesare Zavattini
Italian black-and-white films
1940s Italian films
1940s Italian-language films